Opéra Sauvage is a soundtrack album by the Greek electronic composer Vangelis, released in 1979. It is the score for the nature documentary of the same title by French filmmaker Frédéric Rossif. It is considered one of Vangelis' best albums, and is his second most successful album in the USA, reaching #42 in the album charts.

Overview
Vangelis produced this album during his electro-acoustic period, which was one of the most productive in his musical career. Opéra Sauvage is more akin to his classic sound than his earlier nature scores for the same director, Frédéric Rossif, such as L'Apocalypse des animaux and La Fête sauvage. A later collaboration with Rossif in the style of Opéra sauvage was Sauvage et Beau.

"Hymne" was re-recorded in choral version for the 1991 Eureka concert by Vangelis in Rotterdam.

Release
The album reached #42 in the Billboard 200, and stayed in the charts for 39 weeks.

Instrumentation
Vangelis plays several synthesizers, piano, Fender Rhodes electric piano (featured extensively on "Rêve"), drums, percussion, xylophone, as well as acoustic & bass guitar ("Chromatique"). Jon Anderson is credited with playing harp on "Flamants Roses".

Composition
The album is full of classical-based and warm melodies, orchestrated with Yamaha CS-80 sounds. "Hymne", "L'Enfant", "Mouettes" and "Irlande" build on fairly simple themes that are developed instrumentally. "Rêve" is, indeed, as the title suggests, a dreamy calm piece with the hint of jazz in the climax. "Chromatique" has a chromatic instrumental line with chords on an acoustic guitar. "Flamants Roses", finally, consists of several parts, from slow to upbeat, and finishing off with a bluesy finale; Jon Anderson features prominently on harp.

Reception

In the Allmusic review it is described as "rich, electronic orchestrations range from grandly symphonic to simple and serene", and as an "excellent introduction to his music".

Track listing

Personnel
Vangelis – synthesizers and all instruments
Jon Anderson – harp on "Flamants Roses"

Production
Vangelis – producer, arranger, artwork and cover design
Keith Spencer-Allen, Raphael Preston, Marlis Duncklau – engineers
Raphael Preston, Marlis Duncklau – assistant engineers
Hitoshi Takiguchi – mastering engineer
Veronique Skawinska – photography
Tokiwa Kinoshita – art coordinator
Minoru Harada – product manager

Other appearances
A documentary on the Chariots of Fire (1981) special-edition DVD-video relates that director Hugh Hudson intended to use the 7/4 piece "L'Enfant", which he was particularly fond of, as the opening titles over the first scene on the beach, until Vangelis talked him into letting him compose the iconic Chariots of Fire theme. The director then had "L'Enfant" being played in the film by a brass band as source music. A re-recorded version of "Hymne" was used as the score cue for Eric Liddell's first race in the Scottish highlands.
"L'Enfant" was included in the soundtrack of the film The Year of Living Dangerously (1982) by Peter Weir.
It was also used as the theme for the 1980 Winter Olympics in USA.
"Hymne" was the tune of Barilla pasta television advertisements aired in Italy throughout the 1980s. In the US, it was the tune for Ernest & Julio Gallo wine advertisements.
"L'enfant" was the main title music of the Hungarian TV program "A Hét" (The Week) in the late 1980s and the early 1990s.
 A sample of "Rêve" was used in the 2002 single "Solarcoaster" by Solarstone

Charts

Weekly charts

Year-end charts

References

External links
 Opera Sauvage at Vangelis Movements

1979 albums
1979 soundtrack albums
Vangelis soundtracks
Vangelis albums
Polydor Records albums
Polydor Records soundtracks